Aesop (stylised as Aēsop) is an Australian luxury cosmetics brand owned by Brazilian company Natura & Co that produces  skin, hair, body care and fragrance products headquartered in Fitzroy, Victoria, Australia. 

Aesop was established in 1987 by Dennis Paphitis in Armadale, several suburbs away from the brand's current headquarters. At the time, Paphitis owned and operated a hair salon named Emeis where part of his business involved blending essential oils into hair products. After continued success, he rebranded to Aesop. Naming the brand after the Greek fabulist and storyteller was an intentional ploy by Paphitis to mock the puffery exhibited in the advertising of competing cosmetic brands. He eventually sold the brand to Natura & Co in 2012 while maintaining a role as advisor. 

Each Aesop store has a unique interior design developed in collaboration with various architects, interior designers and artists. As of 2019, the brand had over 320 points of sale across 25 countries. Aesop currently produces 83 product formulations and three shaving accessories.

History
Aesop was founded by hairdresser Dennis Paphitis in 1987 in Armadale, Melbourne. Suzanne Santos, whose current job title is Chief Customer Officer, was instrumental in the founding and growth of the company. She was Paphitis's first employee. In 2020, Aesop introduced their first Candle product line with 3 new scents titled Ptolemy, Aganice, and Callippus.

In 2010 Harbert Australia Private Equity bought a minority stake in the company; Aesop used the capital injection to fund growth. In December 2012, Aesop sold a 65% stake in its business to Brazilian direct-sales cosmetics company Natura Cosméticos for US$71.6 million (approximately A$100 million). Natura took total ownership in December 2016. In September 2018, Aesop launched a luxe homewares product.

For the company's national and international experience in sustainable development, and eco-friendly products, the Environment Possibility Award conferred the "Award of Green-Trend Leader" to Aesop in 2020.

Corporate identity
The brand has been noted for following a modern approach to prestige branding. This includes not using traditional advertisements or discount sales to promote its products but rather getting noticed and talked about for the design of its products, stores, events and communications.

Name, logo, and branding 
According to founder Dennis Paphitis, the brand's name was inspired by the Greek fabulist and storyteller credited with a number of fables. Originally named "Emeis" - which in Greek means "us", and the namesake of Paphitis's hairdressing salon at the time, the brand's name was changed to Aesop in response to the sometimes exaggerated claims made by competitors about their products. Aesop has a minimalist approach to branding, with their logo being a simple transcription of the brand's name in Optima font. Their brand image is described by Social Entrepreneur and Writer Tony Kearney as the key behind its success who credits Aesop with having crafted one of the most beautiful brand programs in existence. After 20 years of operation, the brand retained digital strategist Work & Co to redesign the online experience. The website redesign was critically acclaimed, winning three awards.

Store design 
Aesop retail stores are considered to place local relevance and understatement as a priority in their design. The brand consistently uses authentic materials in store construction projects, with this described as a “sensible use of the existing space and façade”. Notable designers and architects have been involved in the creation of Aesop stores. In 2008, British designer Ilse Crawford designed the first London based store for the brand, located in a Victorian Grade II listed mansion block in Mayfair. The store was noted for its restoration of a historic building with modern additions with brass and ceramic while maintaining original fittings such as the pitch pine floor. In 2021, Odami, a Spanish-Canadian design studio was retained by Aesop to design a new store in Yorkville. Odami described the project as one which paid homage to the history of Yorkville, which retains many homes of Victorian design. The Victorian-style finishing's were noted, as was the design's minimalist approach.

Internal culture 
Aesop has a distinct internal company culture consisting of minimalism and order. Aesop employees are referred to as "Aesopians" and are subject to certain unique company rules and guidelines, such as using only black Moleskin notebooks and black pens and sending all emails with a greeting or pleasantry at its beginning and end. Its offices have been described as "minimal...upmarket prison cell[s]", and employees are not permitted to eat food at or keep personal items on desks. This order is said to stem from Paphitis's inclination for control over Aesop, who has acknowledged "[Aesop] labour[s] over seemingly inane decisions...to make things appear effortless...there's a great deal of energy involved". Other elements of the internal culture include keeping mobile phones on silent inside offices and using Aesop's brand colours on company documents. Former General Manager of Marketing Lisa D'Amico has stated, "the colours used on PowerPoint presentations are really, really important, particularly to the board. If [one is] not OK with that, [they] just won't enjoy [working at Aesop]". Such edicts have been described as "specific yet vague" that make being a potential employee stressful. D'Amico acknowledged Aesop takes "cultural alignment to the nth degree" and noted cultural fit between Aesop and its employees ought to be mutual.

Points of sale 
Aesop has over 235 company owned signature stores across Australia, New Zealand, Japan, Canada, Singapore, Malaysia, South Korea, USA, Taiwan, Italy, France, The Netherlands, Germany, Switzerland, Russia, Hong Kong, Sweden, Norway, Spain, Brazil, United Arab Emirates, Belgium and the UK. In the US, it is also available at Nordstrom and Saks Fifth Avenue. In Canada, Aesop's products can be found at Holt Renfrew, Ogilvy, Nordstrom, and Saks Fifth Avenue.

Its largest store in 2017 was its  space in the Broadway Theater District in Downtown Los Angeles where the walls are lined with reclaimed cardboard tubing from fabric rolls discarded by the nearby fashion district. Other elements of the store's interior are made entirely from recycled paper.

Management
Michael O'Keeffe has been CEO of Aesop since 2003.

See also
Diptyque
Le Labo
Byredo

References

Australian companies established in 1987
Cosmetics companies of Australia
Australian brands
Luxury brands
Companies based in Melbourne
B Lab-certified corporations in Australia